Dornot is a former commune in the Moselle department in north-eastern France. On 1 January 2016, it was merged into the new commune Ancy-Dornot. It is situated on the left bank of the river Moselle. Its population was 167 in 2019.

History 

In September 1944, American General George S. Patton led Walton Walker's XX Corps in a botched attempt to cross the Moselle at Dornot. The fierce fighting led to a defensive victory for the Germans. See Lorraine Campaign.

See also 
 Communes of the Moselle department
 Parc naturel régional de Lorraine

References 

Former communes of Moselle (department)
Populated places disestablished in 2016